Teterboro Airport  is a general aviation relief airport in the boroughs of Teterboro, Moonachie, and Hasbrouck Heights in Bergen County, New Jersey. It is owned and managed by the Port Authority of New York and New Jersey and operated by AFCO AvPORTS Management. The airport is in the New Jersey Meadowlands,  from Midtown Manhattan, which makes it popular for private and corporate aircraft.

The airport takes up almost all of Teterboro and consists of :  for aircraft hangar and offices,  for aeronautical use and runways, and  undeveloped. The airport has more than 1,137 employees, of whom more than 90% are full-time.

In April 2009, the Federal Aviation Administration (FAA) reported that the airport had the third highest rate of wildlife strikes of any airport in the United States, based on takeoffs and landings (43 per 100,000).

Teterboro is home to many private aviation charter companies flying nationally and globally.

History
Teterboro Airport is the oldest operating airport in the New York City area. Walter C. Teter (1863–1929) acquired the property in 1917. North American Aviation operated a manufacturing plant on the site during World War I. After the war, the airport served as a base of operations for Anthony Fokker, the Dutch aircraft designer. The first flight from the present airport site was made in 1919. In 1926,
Colonial Air Transport at Teterboro was the first private company to deliver mail by air.

During World War II, the United States Army operated the airport. The Port Authority of New York & New Jersey purchased it on April 1, 1949, from Fred L. Wehran, a private owner, and later leased it to Pan American World Airways (and its successor organization Johnson Controls) for 30 years until December 1, 2000, when the Port Authority assumed full responsibility for the operation of Teterboro.

Recent statistics
In 2019, Teterboro Airport trailed Republic Airport in total number of aircraft operations by 46,047 (173,625 at TEB vs 219,672 at FRG), making it the second busiest general aviation airport in the region and fifth busiest airport when including operations from Kennedy Airport (463,198), Newark Airport (449,543), and LaGuardia Airport (374,539).

In 2020 during the COVID-19 pandemic, the airport saw a significant drop in total number of aircraft operations, with a reduction in traffic to 86,465 (difference in 87,160 flights); Teterboro leads Republic Airport in transient flights, however, while Republic has more local general aviation traffic and had 165,250 flights during the pandemic.

Facilities

Buildings

Two large office buildings are centrally located, one at 90 Moonachie Avenue and the other on Fred Wehran Drive, which houses the Department of Homeland Security.

There is also an operations building, maintenance facility and two fuel farms.

The airport contains the Aviation Hall of Fame of New Jersey.

Control tower
The control tower was built on the east side of the airport by the FAA and went into operation on October 29, 1975. The original control tower is not operational but is still part of the original wooden Atlantic Aviation hangar on Industrial Avenue. It is on the northeast corner of the hangar.

Runways
Runway 6 approach has an Instrument Landing System (ILS) and a Medium Approach Lighting System-R (MALS-R). Runway 24 approach is equipped with both a Precision Approach Path Indicator (PAPI) and Runway End Identification Lights (REIL) systems. Runway 6-24 underwent complete overlay and grooving in 1987.

Both runways 1 and 19 are equipped with REIL systems. Runway 1 approach is equipped with a VASI system. Runway 19 approach has an ILS and a Precision Approach Path Indicator (PAPI). Runway 1-19 was overlaid and grooved in the summer of 2000, and included the installation of centerline and touchdown zone lighting. Runway 19 is the preferred runway for noise abatement procedures.

Taxiways
About  of taxiways exist on the airport.

Aircraft
In 2017 the airport had 178,369 aircraft operations, averaging 488 per day: 65.6% general aviation, 34% air taxi, 0.3% military, and <1% airline. 121 aircraft were then based at this airport: 81% jet, 10.7% helicopter, 6.6% single-engine, and 1.7% multi-engine.

Other
The Aviation Hall of Fame of New Jersey is on the airport grounds. Founded in 1972, it is the first state aviation hall of fame in the nation, honoring the men and women who brought outstanding aeronautical achievements to the state. The museum offers visitors an opportunity to view historic air and space equipment and artifacts, photographs, fine art and an extensive model collection. The library has more than 4,000 volumes and hundreds of aviation video tapes.

Public transportation 
Teterboro Airport can be reached from the Port Authority Bus Terminal in Midtown Manhattan on New Jersey Transit bus routes 161 (regular service), 165 (limited weekday service) and 144 (peak periods weekdays).  The Teterboro station is the closest rail station along NJ Transit's Pascack Valley Line, but the Wood-Ridge station is also close to the southwest of the airport.

Notable incidents
In 1956 and again in 1958, Thomas Fitzpatrick flew stolen aircraft from Teterboro and landed them along city streets in the Hudson Heights, Manhattan neighborhood.

In June 1966, in Hasbrouck Heights, a two-engine Piper Aztec going to Teterboro Airport crashed, striking a tree and narrowly missing homes on Burton Avenue near U.S. Route 46 (US 46). The pilot sustained injuries including a skull fracture and was taken to Hackensack Hospital by ambulance. He was carrying film for Eastman Kodak.

The airplane had a flight plan to Teterboro from Syracuse, New York. The helicopter was inbound to Teterboro from Woodbridge, NJ. The helicopter fell into the Meadowlands Sports Complex parking lot, and both persons aboard were killed. The pilot was seriously injured, and the passenger received minor injuries.

On December 9, 1999, a small plane crashed between two houses in neighboring Hasbrouck Heights, killing all four people aboard, injuring three people on the ground and setting a garage on fire.

On March 9, 2002 a single-engine Cessna 210 with a flight plan to Montauk, NY, crashed shortly after takeoff about 2 p.m. killing the only occupant and pilot.

On September 9, 2002, a Piper Saratoga carrying a Canadian family took off from Teterboro Airport and crashed into a housing development in Hunterdon County 10 minutes later. The parents were killed, and the two children were critically injured. The incident caused millions in damage.

On February 2, 2005 at 7:18 a.m., a Bombardier Challenger CL-600-1A11, N370V, hurtled off a runway at Teterboro Airport, skidded across US 46 and slammed into a warehouse during the morning rush, injuring 20 people, 11 of them on the plane. It was mere coincidence – a red traffic signal – that thwarted a full-scale disaster. A moment later, and the intersection would have been swarming with commuter traffic. Forty-five minutes later classes would have been in session at the nearby Teterboro campus of Bergen County Technical High School. An hour later the warehouse would have been filled with 200 workers. The two pilots were seriously injured, as were two occupants in a vehicle. The cabin aide, eight passengers, and one person in the building received minor injuries. Five people remained hospitalized, one of them gravely injured. A 66-year-old Paterson man who was riding in a car the jet struck was on life support, authorities said. Later that year, Congress passed legislation authored by U.S. Senator Frank Lautenberg that directed the FAA to install  arrestor beds at all U.S. airports.

On September 2, 2005 at 21:22 local time, a Cessna 177A, N30491, crashed in South Hackensack during an emergency landing at Teterboro airport. A Teterboro employee observed the plane descending toward runway 24, lost sight of it as it descended below the horizon, then saw two or three bright flashes. The pilot sustained fatal injuries and the passenger serious injuries.

On October 11, 2006 a Cirrus SR20 took off from Teterboro and crashed in New York City at 2:42 pm local time. The aircraft struck the north side of an apartment building on the Upper East Side of Manhattan; it caused a fire in two apartments on the 40th and 41st floors, which was extinguished within an hour. The aircraft was owned and piloted by New York Yankees pitcher Cory Lidle, who died in the accident along with his flight instructor. As a result of this accident the FAA established restrictions on flying up the East River.

Two midair collisions have occurred over the Hudson River involving aircraft that departed from Teterboro, one in 1976, and one in 2009. As a result of the later accident the FAA came up with new guidelines for pilots flying the Hudson River, including mandatory reporting points and separating slower helicopter traffic from faster fixed-wing traffic via assigned altitude blocks.

On January 15, 2009, Teterboro Airport was suggested as a potential landing site for the crippled US Airways Flight 1549, whose engines were disabled on takeoff from nearby LaGuardia Airport after a flock of birds flew into the plane. The pilots determined that they did not have enough altitude to make it to Teterboro, instead choosing to attempt a landing in the Hudson River. The successful landing is referred to as the Miracle on the Hudson.

On August 21, 2009, around 3:00 a.m., a Beechcraft Baron crashed while attempting to land. The pilot and passenger survived but sustained burns requiring the attention of Saint Barnabas Medical Center's burn unit, the only one in the state of New Jersey. The plane was believed to have originated at Reading, PA, and was carrying blood samples for Quest Diagnostics, which has a lab on property adjacent to Teterboro Airport.

On October 1, 2010, at about 1:45 p.m., a G-4 Gulfstream overshot the runway. It was stopped by an arrester bed. Seven passengers and two pilots were on the plane. No one was injured. The cause of the accident has not been determined.

On December 20, 2011, a single-engine TBM700 crashed on Interstate 287 near Morristown after leaving Teterboro Airport headed for Georgia. Five people, including a family of four and one other passenger, were killed.

The pilot and co-pilot were killed; no others were on board. It had departed Philadelphia International Airport shortly before. The National Transportation Safety Board (NTSB) safety recommendations from this accident included a requirement for "operators to establish programs for flight crewmembers who have demonstrated performance deficiencies or  experienced failures during training and administer additional oversight and training to address and correct performance deficiencies."

On August 21, 2018, a Gulf Stream IV jet transporting musician Post Malone took off from Teterboro Airport on its way to London Luton Airport in Luton, England. Shortly after takeoff, the pilots discovered that the two left main tires of the landing gear had blown out. After circling the airport for nearly an hour, in hopes of making an emergency landing, the plane was diverted to Westfield-Barnes Regional Airport in western Massachusetts where it once again circled the airspace, burning fuel before its descent attempt in order to lighten the plane's weight. Once again, the plane was diverted to Stewart International Airport, a public/military airport equipped with longer runways, meaning pilots would not need to engage reverse thrusters or spoilers, thereby lessening the weight on the landing gear and the plane's remaining tires. Ultimately, the plane landed on the approximately 12,000 foot long Runway 9, which is nearly double the length of the longest runway at Teterboro Airport. All passengers and crew members survived the landing with no injuries.

In popular culture
In January 1954, Arthur Godfrey buzzed the Teterboro control tower with his Douglas DC-3, resulting in a six-month suspension of his license. Godfrey claimed that windy conditions forced him to turn immediately after takeoff when, in fact, he was angry with the tower due to him not getting clearance on the runway that he requested. Seven years later, in 1961, Godfrey recorded a satirical song about the incident called "Teterboro Tower." The song, performed roughly to the tune of "Wabash Cannonball", was released as a 45-inch single by Contempo Records.

On July 24, 1973, Bob Gruen photographed Led Zeppelin in front of The Starship, the band's private Boeing 720 passenger jet, before it departed for a gig at Three Rivers Stadium in Pittsburgh. The photo is considered an iconic shot of the band.

In the final scene of the 1994 film Wolf, Michelle Pfeiffer's character, Laura Alden, tells detectives that Jack Nicholson's character, Will Randall, is most likely on his way to Teterboro Airport. Moments later, a detective confirms that a plane chartered by Alden is waiting at the airport.

The airport can be seen in two episodes of The Sopranos. In the first episode of the second season, the airport can be seen in the background of a driving scene, doubling as Newark Liberty International Airport. The airport is also seen and mentioned, by name, in the series finale.

In 2003, Jay-Z coined the nickname "clearport" for Teterboro on his song "Excuse Me Miss", in reference to Teterboro having less traffic than other major commercial airports in the New York metropolitan area.

The airport is mentioned as a potential emergency landing location for US Airways Flight 1549 in the 2016 biographical drama film Sully, as it was in the true life 2009 event the film is based on.

In the first season finale of the 2021 television series Chucky, the airport is mentioned as the destination for a truckload of Good Guy dolls.

In the 2022 film Uncharted, the characters Nathan Drake and Victor Sullivan travel to Barcelona via Teterboro Airport. In May 2022, the airport was used as a location in the fourth episode of the Netflix comedy series, The Pentaverate when a helicopter piloted by the Mike Myers character, Ken Scarborough, is remotely controlled to land at Teterboro Airport. In the debut issue of New Fantastic Four, published by Marvel Comics in June 2022, Wolverine informs Spider-Man that he has a cab waiting to bring them to Teterboro Airport.

See also

 Aviation in the New York metropolitan area
 List of airports in New Jersey
 US Airways Flight 1549

References

External links

 Teterboro Airport, Port Authority website
 Teterboro Airport (TEB) at New Jersey DOT Airport Directory
 Aviation photos of Teterboro Airport at jetphotos.net
 Passur KTEB Airport Monitor Live Flight Tracker
 Aerial image as of March 1995 from USGS The National Map
 Aviation Hall of Fame of New Jersey
 Time; January 28, 1929; Died. Walter C. Teter, 66, founder of the community & airport at Teterboro, New Jersey; after a short illness; in Manhattan.
 
 

1919 establishments in New Jersey
Airports established in 1919
Airports in New Jersey
Transportation buildings and structures in Bergen County, New Jersey
Port Authority of New York and New Jersey
Hasbrouck Heights, New Jersey
Moonachie, New Jersey
Teterboro, New Jersey